Bathos is a literary term and device.

Bathos may also refer to:
Bathos (album), by the group Aarni
Bathos (EP), by the group Aborted
Bathos (Arcadia), a town of ancient Arcadia, Greece